Tomás Guevara Silva (1865–1935) was a Chilean historian, teacher, War of the Pacific veteran and a prominent scholar of the Mapuche people. He was born in Curicó.

Bibliography
Historia de Curicó (1890)
La etnolojía araucana en el poema de Ercilla

References

19th-century Chilean historians
20th-century Chilean historians
20th-century Chilean male writers
Chilean schoolteachers
Chilean military personnel of the War of the Pacific
1865 births
1935 deaths
20th-century Chilean educators
Historians of the Mapuche world